Kings Point is a 2012 short documentary film about five seniors living in a retirement resort in Kings Point, Florida, directed by Sari Gilman. The film was nominated for the 2013 Academy Award for Best Documentary (Short Subject).

After being nominated for an Academy Award the film was released along with all the other 15 Oscar-nominated short films in theaters by ShortsHD.

References

External links

Kings Point at Women Make Movies

2012 films
2012 short documentary films
Documentary films about old age
Films shot in Florida
American short documentary films
Kickstarter-funded documentaries
2010s English-language films
2010s American films